The 1999 Pacific Lutheran Lutes football team was an American football team that represented Pacific Lutheran University in the Northwest Conference during the 1999 NCAA Division III football season. In their 28th season under head coach Frosty Westering, the Lutes compiled a 13–1 record and won the NCAA Division III national championship.

The team was led on offense by running back Anthony Hicks. Hicks set single-season school records with 1,633 rushing yards, 162 points scored, and 27 touchdowns. He received first-team All-America honors from USAFOOTBALL.com.

Other key players included quarterback Chad Johnson (Offensive Player of the Year All-Northwest Conference) and offensive linemen Josh Hostetter (second-team USAFOOTBALL.com All-American) and Andrew Finstuen (second-team Football Gazette NCAA DIII All-American).

Coach Westering was inducted into the College Football Hall of Fame in 2005.

Schedule

Roster

 2	Zach Hiatt	E	Sr.
 3	Kevin Lint	RB	Sr.
 4	Benji Sonnichsen	DB	Fr.
 5	Jonathan Carlson	DB	So.
 6	David Krueger	PK/P	Jr.
 7	Seth Berghoff	DB	Fr.
 8	Chris Blakney	DB	Fr.
 9	Shipley Ennis	RB	Jr.
 10	Steve Alseth	DB	Jr.
 11	Tyler Teeple	QB	Fr.
 12	Greg Pace	QB	Jr.
 13	Casey Carlson	DB	Fr.
 14	Eric Parks	QB	Fr.
 15	Mike Ramirez	RB	Fr.
 17	Chad Johnson	QB	Jr.
 19	Todd McDevitt	E	Jr.
 20	Devin Pierce	E	Fr.
 21	David Jefferies	DB	Jr.
 22	Nate Grygorcewicz	DB	Jr.
 23	Jacob Croft	RB	Sr.
 24	Judd Hunter	DB	Sr.
 25	Luke Balash	RB	Sr.
 26	Anthony Hicks	RB	Sr.
 27	Tim Holmes	DB	So.
 28	David Goodsell	LB	Jr.
 29	Scott Sarrenson	DB/P	So.
 30	Tate Mathison	DB	Fr.
 31	Mike Mauss	LB	So.
 32	Kawika McGuire	RB	Fr.
 33	Tyler Shillito	DB	So.
 34	Chris Pitzer	RB	Fr.
 35	Tim Lax	LB	Sr.
 38	Luke Gearhard	LB	Jr.
 39	Ben Cochran	RB	So.
 40	Joe Mertlich	LB	Fr.
 41	Jeremy Johnston	LB	Sr.
 42	Troy Testerman	RB	Fr.
 43	Matt Locher	LB	Fr.
 44	Brian Anderson	LB	Jr.
 45	Aaron Binger	RB	Fr.
 46	Case deVries	LB	Fr.
 47	Ian Hanly	LB	Fr.
 48	Herb Lehman	DL	Sr.
 49	Josh Parsons	LB	Fr.
 50	Ben McGrann	LB	So.
 51	Steve Yahns	OL	So.
 52	Chris Inverso	LB	Fr.
 54	Andrew Finstuen	OL	Sr.
 55	Josh Hostetter	OL	Sr.
 57	Rob Shipp	OL	Jr.
 58	Jasen Bennie	LB	So.
 60	Robb Dressel	OL	Fr.
 61	Jake Allan	OL	So.
 62	Trevor Roberts	OL	So.
 65	Nate Cogdill	OL	Fr.
 66	Eric Arena	OL	Sr.
 68	Jeff Reynolds	OL	Fr.
 70	Scott Wyckoff	OL	Jr.
 71	Micah Morino	OL	Fr.
 74	Matt Nichols	OL	Jr.
 75	Chuck Woodard	OL	So.
 77	Willy Wurster	OL	Sr.
 78	Christian Foreman	DL	Jr.
 79	Isaac Williams	OL	Jr.
 80	Kevin Giboney	E	So.
 81	David Weller	E	Fr.
 82	Tyler Kechely	E	Sr.
 83	Kyle Brown	E	Fr.
 84	Paul Smith	E	So.
 88	Jess Nelson	E	Jr.
 90	Kris Helphinstine	DL	So.
 91	John Bailey	DL	Fr.
 92	Luke Jacobson	DL	Sr.
 95	Rob Case	DL	Sr.
 97	Brian Fulker	DL	So.
 98	John Eussen	DL	Sr.
 99	Andy Armstrong	DL	Jr.

References

Pacific Lutheran
Pacific Lutheran Lutes football seasons
NCAA Division III Football Champions
Pacific Lutheran Lutes football